A constitutional referendum was held in South Korea on 28 October 1987. The changes to the constitution were approved by 94.4% of voters, with a turnout of 78.2%.

Results

References

 
1987 referendums
1987 elections in South Korea
Constitutional referendums in South Korea